Katharine Anne Egerton Warburton (24 March 1840 – 18 October 1923), known as Mother Kate, was a British Anglican nun and Mother Superior. She rescued the Society of Saint Margaret in Hackney after many of the nuns left to become Roman Catholics.

Life 

Warburton was born in Warburton, Cheshire. She was the first child of Anne (born Stone) and  James Francis Egerton-Warburton. Her Oxford-educated father was a Church of England priest. He became rector of Lymm cum Warburton in 1832. Her father died while she was still a child in 1849. She took religious guidance from her cousin, the poet, Rowland Egerton-Warburton. Rowland was a religious man with his own private chapel at Arley Hall. A choir would sing Matins every day, his staff would attend, and he would appear even if it was in his hunting attire.

When she was eighteen she wanted to join Elizabeth Neale at the Community of the Holy Cross, but her cousin's chaplain Charles Gutch recommended that she join the Society of Saint Margaret which had been founded in 1855 by Elizabeth Neale's brother, John Mason Neale. At the time these societies were controversial in the Anglican church.

At the age of 21, she gave her vows to the church. Her first work was at St Mary's Church, Charing Cross Road. She helped with caring for the sick and dying in the parish and teaching at the church's day schools and night schools. The work there was abandoned in 1865 but her experience was recorded in her two books Memories of a Sister of S Saviour's Priory and Old Soho Days and other Memories (in 1906)..

In 1866 she joined a group who were forming a daughter house at Haggerston in the East End of London. Within two years many of the nuns had decided to leave the Church of England and to become Roman Catholics. In 1868 when she was 28, she became the mother to the remaining two nuns and the novices. The nuns who had left had taken all the funds and the building. Temporary homes were found but she would sleep on a table and their food would be cabbage. 

They lived on Great Cambridge Street and ministered to the people of Haggerston with what was reported as its "crushed down desolate poverty". The group proved themselves when there was an outbreak of smallpox. They wrote to The Times and their appeal enabled them to give out food, clothes and bedding as they nursed those afflicted. She and the nuns went on to establish the instruments of social work. By 1888 they had created a dispensary, a nursery and the priory had a new building. Children were sent to their holiday homes in addition to the welfare they received during the rest of the year.

Death and legacy 
Warburton died in 1923 at the convent in London. In 1925 the priory published Memories of Mother Kate by an unknown author.

The Society of Saint Margaret in Hackney was operating in 2023.

References 

1840 births
1923 deaths
People from Cheshire (before 1974)
19th-century Anglican nuns
20th-century Anglican nuns